Oliver Dinwiddie Tucker (January 27, 1902 – July 13, 1940) was a Major League Baseball outfielder who played for two seasons. He played for the Washington Senators for 20 games in 1927 and the Cleveland Indians for 14 games in 1928. Ollie Tucker was inducted into the International League Hall of Fame in 2008, one of only 118 total individuals. He had a career playing major and minor league baseball that spanned 14 years, beginning at age 19 with the Cedartown Cedars in 1921 and finishing up with the Buffalo Bisons in 1935. His 6 seasons with the Bisons earned him induction into the Buffalo Baseball Hall of Fame on August 21, 1986. Ollie Tucker died following surgery for removal of a brain tumor.

In 34 games over two major league seasons, Tucker posted a .155 batting average (11-for-71) with 6 runs, 1 home run, 10 RBI and 11 bases on balls. Defensively, he handled 30 total chances (27 putouts, 3 assists) without an error for a 1.000 fielding percentage as a right fielder.

References
Ollie Tucker Minor Leagues Statistics & History

The Baseball Necrology: The Post-Baseball Lives and Deaths of More Than 7,600 Major League Players and Others

External links

1902 births
1940 deaths
Major League Baseball outfielders
Washington Senators (1901–1960) players
Cleveland Indians players
Baseball players from Virginia
People from Madison County, Virginia
Deaths from brain cancer in the United States
Cedartown Cedars players